Valyermo (Spanish: "Barren Valley") is an unincorporated community located in the Mojave Desert, in Los Angeles County, California. The community has a population of about 450.

Geography 
The ZIP code for Valyermo is 93563 and the area code 661.

About Valyermo 
"Valyermo" is a contraction of the Spanish words "valle yermo", or "barren valley".

St. Andrew's Abbey is a Roman Catholic monastery (Benedictine) located in the foothills of the Antelope Valley in Valyermo.

Dan Empfield, one of the instrumental figures in the development of the sport of triathlon, resides in Valyermo.

References

External links
Saint Andrew's Abbey

Unincorporated communities in Los Angeles County, California
Antelope Valley
Populated places in the Mojave Desert
Unincorporated communities in California